Lac de Chavoley is a lake at Ceyzérieu in the Ain department, France. It is located 300 m east of Lac de Morgnieu.

Chavoley